Viorel Cibotaru (born 19 April 1958) is a Moldovan politician, former political analyst and journalist, who served as the Minister of Defense of Moldova between 18 February 2015 and 30 July 2015. Since 18 June 2016 Cibotaru is chairman of the Liberal Democratic Party of Moldova.
Cibotaru has authored four books.

Biography 
Viorel Cibotaru was born on 19 April 1958 in Chișinău. Between 1975 and 1980 he studied journalism at the State University of Moldova, and between 1981 and 1986 he graduated as a doctor of philological sciences.

In 1987 he held an internship at the Faculty of Journalism at "Mikhail Lomonosov" University in Moscow and in the same year he obtained his PhD in Philological Sciences. Between 1985 and 1988 he was a lecturer at the Faculty of Journalism at the State University of Moldova.

Between 1988 and 1992 he was first deputy head of the Education and Culture Directorate, head of the Interethnic Relations Sector, head of the Information Center of the Republican Council of Trade Unions in Moldova and Deputy Editor-in-Chief of "Vocea Poporului" newspaper.

In 1992, he was awarded the degree of Major.

Between 1992 and 1995 he was editor-in-chief of the newspaper "Oastea Moldovei", a publication of the Ministry of Defense. In 1995–1997 he was head of the Ministry of Defense press secretariat.

In 1996 he was transferred from active service to reserve, and in 1997 he was assigned lieutenant colonel.

Between 1997 and 1999 he was head of the Foreign Relations Department of the Ministry of Defense.  In 1999 he was the deputy commander of the Peacekeeping Forces of the Republic of Moldova, and during July–December he was Lecturer at the Faculty of Journalism and Communication Sciences at the State University of Moldova. From December 1999 to June 2013, he was a lecturer at the journalism department of the Faculty of Journalism and Communication Sciences at the State University of Moldova.

Between 2000 and 2006 he was director of programs at the Institute of Public Policy (IPP). Since 2006 he is the director of the Invisible College of Moldova, Director of the European Institute for Political Studies in Moldova. Between 2008 and 2010 he was director of the Information and Documentation Center about NATO in Moldova. Since 2009, he is a Superior Associate member, Program Coordinator in Nepal of the Center from Geneva for the Democratic Control of Armed Forces.

On 18 February 2015, he was appointed Minister of Defense of the Republic of Moldova, which he exercised until 30 July 2015, when in the new cabinet he was replaced by Liberal Anatol Șalaru.

On 18 June 2016, the National Congress of the Liberal Democratic Party of Moldova took place. Candidates Valeriu Streleț, Liliana Palihovici, Tudor Deliu and Vadim Pistrinciuc, withdrew their candidacies in favor of Viorel Cibotaru. Thus, Cibotaru was elected chairman of the party.

Personal life
Viorel Cibotaru is married and has one child. Besides Romanian, he speaks English, French, Russian, and Italian.

Military Awards
 The Medal "In the Service of the Homeland", 1st degree 
 The Medal "The 20th Anniversary of the National Army"
 Cross For Merit, first-class
 Cross "For Impeccable Service", first-class

Publications
He has written four books and 80 scientific and publishing articles, published in publishing houses, in specialized editions, magazines, newspapers, or on the Internet.

References

1958 births
Living people
Moldovan philologists
Moldovan journalists
Male journalists
Politicians from Chișinău
Moldovan military personnel
Moldovan Ministers of Defense
Liberal Democratic Party of Moldova politicians
Academic staff of Moldova State University